Megacopta is a genus of true bugs in the family Plataspidae.

Species
 Megacopta bicolor Hsiao & Jen 1977
 Megacopta bituminata (Montandon 1897)
 Megacopta breviceps (Horváth 1879)
 Megacopta caliginosa (Montandon, 1893)
 Megacopta callosa (Yang, 1934)
 Megacopta centronubila (Yang, 1934)
 Megacopta centrosignata (Yang, 1934)
 Megacopta cribraria (Fabricius, 1798) (kudzu bug)
 Megacopta cribriella Hsiao & Jen, 1977
 Megacopta cycloceps Hsiao & Jen, 1977
 Megacopta dinghushana Chen, 1989
 Megacopta distanti (Montandon, 1893)
 Megacopta fimbriata (Distant, 1887)
 Megacopta fimbrilla Li, 1981
 Megacopta horvathi (Montandon, 1894)
 Megacopta hui (Yang, 1934)
 Megacopta laeviventris Hsiao & Jen, 1977
 Megacopta liniola Hsiao & Jen, 1977
 Megacopta lobata (Walker, 1867)
 Megacopta longruiana Ren, 2000
 Megacopta punctatissima (Montandon, 1894)(Japanese common plataspid stinkbug)
 Megacopta rotunda Hsiao & Jen, 1977
 Megacopta subsolitaris (Yang, 1934)
 Megacopta tubercula Hsiao & Jen, 1977
 Megacopta verrucosa (Montandon, 1897)
 Megacopta w-nigrum (Varshney, 1965)

Symbionts
Bacterial symbionts are necessary for Megacopta bugs to digest soybean plant material.

References

Further reading

External links

 

Shield bugs